Louise Renicks (born 11 September 1982) is a Scottish judoka. She competed for Scotland in the women's 52 kg event at the 2014 Commonwealth Games where she won a gold medal. Her younger sister Kimberley is also a judoka who won a gold medal at the same Games.

References

External links
 Louise & Kimberly Renicks at North Lanarkshire Sporting Hall Of Fame

1982 births
Living people
Scottish female judoka
Commonwealth Games gold medallists for Scotland
Judoka at the 2014 Commonwealth Games
Commonwealth Games medallists in judo
Sportspeople from Coatbridge
Medallists at the 2014 Commonwealth Games